In grammar, an attributive expression is a word or phrase within a noun phrase that modifies the head noun. It may be an:

 attributive adjective
 attributive noun
 attributive verb

or other part of speech, such as an attributive numeral.

See also 
 Property (attribute)
 Attribution (disambiguation)